Roelofsen is a Dutch patronymic surname ("Roelof's son"). People with this surname include:

 (born 1975), Dutch handball player
Grant Roelofsen (born 1996), South African cricketer
Johan Roelofsen (1933–2011), Dutch milkman and inventor of wagon-bed riding
Marco Roelofsen (born 1969), Dutch association football midfielder
Pieter Roelofsen (1908–1966), Dutch rower
Richard Roelofsen (born 1968), Dutch association football striker
Ruan Roelofse (born 1989), South African tennis player

See also
Roelofs, Dutch surname of the same origin

References

Dutch-language surnames
Patronymic surnames